A Field Artillery Tractor or FAT is a specific sub-type of Artillery tractor used for towing a piece of Field Artillery ordnance and sometimes (notably the 25 pounder) also its limber. Field artillery includes field guns and howitzers but excludes anti-tank guns, although FATs could also be used to tow the latter. As such FATs were generally, although not exclusively, soft-skinned vehicles.

See also 
 Morris C8
 AEC Matador
 Scammell Pioneer

Artillery tractors
Soft-skinned vehicles